Gabrielle "Gabby" Newton (born 31 August 2001) is an Australian rules footballer who plays for Western Bulldogs in the AFL Women's (AFLW). She was the Rising Star nominee in round 4 of 2020. Newton was named in the team's best 4 times in the 6 games she played in the 2020 AFL Women's season, with her collecting career high amounts of disposals in rounds 4 and 6. She received 1 best and fairest vote for her performance in round 4 of the 2020 season. It was revealed that Newton had signed a contract extension with the club on 16 June 2021, after playing every game possible for the club that season.

Statistics
Statistics are correct to the end of the 2021 season.

|- style=background:#EAEAEA
| scope=row | 2020 ||  || 5
| 6 || 0 || 0 || 37 || 42 || 79 || 10 || 42 || 0.0 || 0.0 || 6.2 || 7.0 || 13.2 || 1.7 || 7.0 || 1
|-
| scope=row | 2021 ||  || 5
| 9 || 0 || 0 || 45 || 34 || 79 || 17 || 34 || 0.0 || 0.0 || 5.0 || 3.8 || 8.8 || 1.9 || 3.8 || 0
|- class=sortbottom
! colspan=3 | Career
! 15 !! 0 !! 0 !! 82 !! 76 !! 158 !! 27 !! 76 !! 0.0 !! 0.0 !! 5.5 !! 5.1 !! 10.5 !! 1.8 !! 5.1 !! 1
|}

References

External links

 

Living people
2001 births
Northern Knights players (NAB League Girls)
Western Bulldogs (AFLW) players
Australian rules footballers from Victoria (Australia)
Sportswomen from Victoria (Australia)